"" (Holy, holy, holy God) is a German Catholic hymn. The text is the liturgical Sanctus in German. The melody was composed by Oliver Sperling in 2007. It is part of the 2013 German Catholic hymnal Gotteslob as GL 200, in the section Sanctus.

Oliver Sperling, a church musician from Cologne, composed a melody to the liturgical text, which is part of the Mass ordinary, in 2007 for the second edition of the Gotteslob. Set in D major and common time, it uses lively eighth-notes for flow and movement, resting on stresses syllables such as God. is in a Both Osanna-phrases are equal.

References

External links 
 

Catholic hymns in German
2007 songs